Mahmud Astrakhani was one of Küchük Muhammad's sons and a Khan who founded the Khanate of Astrakhan in the 1460s.

Life 
After years of struggle for the throne of the Great Horde against Akhmat Khan, he escaped to the town of Hajji Tarkhan (or Xacitarxan), establishing the independent Khanate of Astrakhan there. Mahmud Astrakhani maintained friendly relations with his powerful neighbors—the Nogay Horde and the Great Horde and coined his own money.

His letter to the Ottoman Sultan Mehmed II (as dispatched on April 10, 1466) is a curious example of diplomatic epistles written in Persian or in the 15th-century Old Tatar language. The content is a necessity of establishment of diplomatic relations between Ottoman  Empire and Astrakhan, and sending ambassadors to Istanbul.

For uncertainties and additional information see the second part of List of Astrakhan khans.

His son Janibeg briefly ruled Crimea in the winter of 1476/77 until he was driven out by the legitimate ruler Nur Devlet.

Genealogy
Genghis Khan
Jochi
Orda Khan
Sartaqtay
Köchü
Bayan
Sasibuqa
Ilbasan
Chimtay
Urus
Temur-Malik
Temür Qutlugh
Temur ibn Temur Qutlugh
Küchük Muhammad
Mahmud bin Küchük

1460s deaths
Khans of Astrakhan
15th-century monarchs in Europe
Year of birth unknown
Khans of the Golden Horde